Mnich may refer to:

Places
Mnich, Silesian Voivodeship, a village in Silesian Voivodeship, south Poland
Mnich, Kutno County, a village in Łódź Voivodeship, central Poland
Mnich (mountain), a mountain in Tatra National Park, Poland
Mnich (Pelhřimov District), a municipality and village in the Vysočina Region, Czech Republic
Mnich, a village and administrative part of Kardašova Řečice in the South Bohemian Region, Czech Republic

People
Geneviève Mnich, French actress